The 2014 Campeonato Nacional Clausura Scotiabank was the 94th Chilean League top flight. The tournament’s champion was Colo-Colo which won its 30th league title after four years without reaching it.

Standings

Results

Pre-Copa Sudamericana Liguilla
Winner qualify for 2014 Copa Sudamericana first stage (Chile 2).

Semi-finals 

Cobresal won 3–2 on aggregate.

Palestino won 5–0 on aggregate.

Final 

Cobresal won 3–2 on aggregate and qualified to the 2014 Copa Sudamericana.

References

External links
2014 Torneo Clausura at Soccerway

Primera División de Chile seasons
Chile
Prim